The Urswick School is a co-educational secondary school and sixth form located in the Hackney Central area of the London Borough of Hackney, London.

The school is named after Revd Christopher Urswick, Rector of Hackney from 1502 to 1522, and a close friend of King Henry VII and his mother, Lady Margaret Beaufort, a great benefactress of learning.

History
Established in 1520 as Hackney Free School, in 1722, it joined with a parochial charity school to form Hackney Free and Parochial School. The school moved to its present location after 1856., and was significantly rebuilt and expanded, being renamed in 2011 as The Urswick School.

Present-day
A voluntary aided school administered by Hackney London Borough Council and the Church of England Diocese of London, Urswick School offers GCSEs, BTECs and ASDAN awards as programmes of study for pupils, and the sixth form can study a range of A-levels and further BTECs and ASDAN awards.

In 2021, The Guardian reported that the Urswick School is "the most disadvantaged secondary school in London and the fifth most disadvantaged in England".

In 2020, the Governing Body of the school settled out of court for repeatedly excluding a student because of her Afro hairstyle. They paid damages of £8,500.
The school have entered into a legally binding agreement about hair policies with the Equality and Human Rights Commission. < https://legal.equalityhumanrights.com/en/case/stopping-school-using-discriminatory-hairstyle-policy>< https://www.whatdotheyknow.com/request/cost_of_legal_letters_or_action#incoming-1622506>

See also
Archdeacon of Hackney
Haberdashers' Company

References

External links
The Urswick School official website

Hackney, London
Secondary schools in the London Borough of Hackney
Church of England secondary schools in the Diocese of London
Educational institutions established in the 1520s
1520 establishments in England
Voluntary aided schools in London